State Route 379 (SR 379) is a short east–west highway in Morrison, Tennessee.

Route description 
SR 379 begins at an intersection with SR 55 in Morrison. SR 379 then becomes East Maple Street and continues to travel northeast before suddenly turning southeast and terminating at SR 55.

History

The entire route of SR 379 follows the former alignment of SR 55 through downtown Morrison.

Major intersections

See also 
List of state routes in Tennessee

References 

379
Transportation in Warren County, Tennessee